Omorgus granulatus is a beetle of the family Trogidae found in India, Sri Lanka, Pakistan, and Afghanistan.

References

granulatus
Beetles of Asia
Insects of Afghanistan
Insects of India
Insects of Pakistan
Beetles described in 1783
Taxa named by Johann Friedrich Wilhelm Herbst